In seismology, a seismic zone or seismic belt is an area of seismicity potentially sharing a common cause. It may also be a region on a map for which a common areal rate of seismicity is assumed for the purpose of calculating probabilistic ground motions. An obsolete definition is a region on a map in which a common level of seismic design is required.

A  type of seismic zone is a Wadati–Benioff zone which corresponds with the down-going slab in a subduction zone.

Examples
Charlevoix Seismic Zone (Quebec, Canada)
New Madrid Seismic Zone (Midwestern United States)
South West Seismic Zone (Western Australia)

See also
List of fault zones

References